Dennis Gentenaar (born 30 September 1975) is a Dutch former footballer who played as a goalkeeper. Besides the Netherlands, he has played in Germany.

Career 
Gentenaar was born in Nijmegen. Coming from the amateur side ZOW, he made his professional debut for NEC on 26 November 1995 aged 20, at home against PSV Eindhoven which NEC lost 5–0. Gentenaar made another appearance later that season, but had to wait until 1998 to make his second appearance in professional football. During that season he played seven matches, still as the second goalkeeper for NEC. From the 2000–01 season, things changed for Gentenaar and he became NEC's first goalkeeper. Since then he only missed nine appearances in five seasons; during the last three seasons he did not miss a single match.

He developed into a trustworthy goalkeeper and his performance earned him a transfer to Bundesliga side Borussia Dortmund. A year later he returned to the Eredivisie, to become second goalkeeper behind Maarten Stekelenburg at Ajax, at which time he won the 2007 KNVB Cup, his first career trophy. On 8 June 2009, he left Ajax and signed a two-year contract with VVV-Venlo. In 2012, he signed with Almere City FC for a two-year period. After a year in the First Division he returned to his former club NEC and signed a contract for one year. He ended his professional career in May 2014. After retiring, he played another season with amateur club SV Ouderkerk.

Personal life
Gentenaar was born in the Netherlands, and is of Indonesian descent through his father.

Gentenaar has a son named Dayen, who also plays as a goalkeeper.

Career statistics

References

External links
 Voetbal International profile 

Living people
1975 births
Footballers from Nijmegen
Association football goalkeepers
Dutch footballers
Dutch people of Indonesian descent
Dutch expatriate footballers
NEC Nijmegen players
Borussia Dortmund players
AFC Ajax players
VVV-Venlo players
Almere City FC players
Eredivisie players
Eerste Divisie players
Bundesliga players
Expatriate footballers in Germany